John David McAdoo (April 4, 1824 – June 16, 1883) was a Confederate general during the American Civil War and a justice of the Texas Supreme Court. Born in Tennessee, he graduated from the University of Tennessee in 1848 and passed the bar. He married in 1852, and would become the father four children.

Moving to Texas in 1854, he continued to practice law and also owned a plantation. At the outbreak of the Civil War, he served as an officer in the 20th Texas Infantry. McAdoo had become a staff officer by 1863, and shortly thereafter was made an assistant adjutant general for state troops. The following year he was promoted to brigadier general and was tasked with defending the frontier from Indian attacks and pursuing army deserters. At war's the end, he became an associate justice of the Texas Supreme Court at the request of governor Edmund J. Davis. He resigned in 1874 to become postmaster of Marshall, finally retiring to farm until his death in Brenham at age 59.

His nephew was politician William Gibbs McAdoo.

References

1824 births
1883 deaths
People from Anderson County, Tennessee
University of Tennessee alumni
American judges
Justices of the Texas Supreme Court
People of Texas in the American Civil War
Confederate militia generals
Farmers from Texas
People from Marshall, Texas
People from Brenham, Texas
19th-century American judges
Military personnel from Texas